Still in Love with You is a 1992 album by American recording artist Meli'sa Morgan, released under Pendulum Records. The album features her cover of Al Green's "I'm Still in Love with You", which peaked at #9, followed by the second single "Through the Tears", a top 20 hit on the Billboard R&B Singles chart. Following its release, the album was a modest hit and reached the top 40 on the Billboard Top R&B Albums chart.

Track listing

Credits
Co-producer [Additional Production], Mixed By [Additional] – Masters At Work (track 1)
Co-producer – Meli'sa Morgan (tracks: 2 to 10)
Producer – Attala Zane Giles (tracks: 2, 5, 9), Michael O'Hara (tracks: 4, 7, 8, 10)
Backing vocals - Genobia Jeter-Jones (track: 1, 7), Karen Anderson (tracks: 3, 4, 6, 8), Don Hamilton (tracks: 4, 10), Bernard Belle (track 1)Sandra Williams (track 7), Kevin Dorsey (track 5), Anthony Evans (track 10), Michael O'Hara (tracks: 4, 7, 10), Meli'sa Morgan (tracks: 2, 5, 7, 8, 10)

Credits taken from original album liner notes.

Charts

Singles

References

1992 albums
Meli'sa Morgan albums
Elektra Records albums
Pendulum Records albums